Ahmed Adamu is a Nigerian petroleum economist and lecturer. He was elected on November 12, 2013 as the first-ever global chairperson of the Commonwealth Youth Council (CYC). Adamu served as the CYC chairperson until March 2016.

Adamu represented his country in international and commonwealth youth programmes, and was the pioneer chief whip of the Nigerian Youth Parliament. Adamu is a petroleum economist, university lecturer, author, and motivational speaker. He is an expert in leadership and personal development, and has trained professionals and young people in leadership and personal development, he is also a certified brain coach. Dr. Ahmed Adamu wrote and published a ten-book series on leadership and personal development. In late 2018, he was appointed as special assistant on youth and strategy to former Nigerian Vice President and 2019 PDP presidential candidate, Alhaji Atiku Abubakar. He contested for member, federal house of representatives, representing Katsina Central Federal Constituency in 2018 PDP primary election, but lost at the primary election.

He was an international expert at United Nation's Global Forum on Youth Policies; Member, Policy Strategy Group, United Nations' World We Want; Member, International Panel of Judges for Youth Citizen Entrepreneurship Competition; Observer member, International Youth Task force for 2014 World Conference on Youth; Member, Advisory group panel on 50th Anniversary of the Commonwealth Secretariat. He was the Nigerian youth observer at the ECOWAS parliament, and the founder and pioneer president of the League for Democratic Youth. Adamu was a member of the Katsina state executive council committee on youth development, he also served as the secretary of the Nigerian constitutional review consultation committee, and was the founder and president of Oil and Gas scholars club. He was the founder and president of Katsina Debate Club, publicity secretary of Civil Liberties organization, Katsina branch, Secretary of Integrity club, Financial Secretary of Students Union Government at Bayero University Kano and Acting National President of National Association of Katsina State Students, National Body, among so many other past leadership responsibilities and experiences.

Adamu holds PhD in Petroleum Economics from Newcastle University, United Kingdom; He is a University Lecturer, also a member of international and national professional organizations. He published and presented many international and national academic papers, and participated in several international and national academic conferences. He published a book titled "Comparative Assessment of Petroleum Sharing Contracts in Nigeria".

He received the awards for 2015 African Youth Awards' Young Personality of the year, African Achievers Award Honour, Inspirational Nigerian in Those Who Inspire (Nigeria), Commonwealth Outstanding Service Award, Global Achievers Award and many other international and national awards of excellence. He was named among 100 most influential young Africans for 2016. He was also ranked among the top 20 most influential young Nigerians in the list of 2016 100 most influential young Nigerians by Advance Media Africa. He has a son and a wife.

He writes on international and national development issues. He inspires and mentors young people.

Education and career experience 
Adamu attended Rafindadi primary school from the age of 4. After graduating from the primary school in 1995, he joined Sir Usman Nagoggo College of Arabic and Islamic Studies in Katsina for his Junior Secondary School Education, graduating in 1998. He then went to Government Commercial College Mai'adua in Katsina State for his Senior Secondary School Education. He finished his senior secondary education in 2001, and he was immediately admitted in to the Bayero University, Kano, where he studied Economics Education. After finishing his first degree in 2006, he went to the University of Dundee, UK in 2010 for his one-year master's degree in Oil and Gas (MSc Oil and Gas Economics). In 2012, he went back to the UK for his PhD programme in Newcastle University. He finished his PhD in December 2015.

Adamu's first job was his one-year compulsory youth service with National Inland Waterways Authority, Lokoja, Kogi State from 2007 to 2008. He was then recruited as a classroom teacher in 2008, where he taught Economics at Government Senior Secondary School, Kambara, Katsina. In 2011, he was recruited as a university lecturer in the Economics Department of Umaru Musa Yar'adua University, Katsina. He is still a lecturer with the university.

Chairperson, Commonwealth Youth Council 
Adamu became the first person elected as the Chairperson of the Commonwealth Youth Council (CYC). He was elected on 12 November 2013 in Hambantota, Sri Lanka during the 2013 Commonwealth Heads of Government Meeting. He contested alongside other youth candidates from Europe and Africa, because the Position of the Chairperson was then zoned to Europe and Africa.

Other leadership experience 
Before emerging as the Chairperson/President of the Commonwealth Youth Council, Adamu has held many other leadership positions. Starting as a student leader in Primary Schools, he was the school prefect, and in his Junior Secondary School, he was appointed as the assistant class monitor. At Senior Secondary School, he was appointed as the Chief College Imam and President of the [Muslims Student's Society], he was at the same time appointed as the Provost Marshal of the Quiz, Debate and Drama Society.

Upon joining the [University], Adamu became actively involved in student union politics, and eventually elected as the [Financial Secretary] of the Student Union Government at Bayero University [Kano]. He was later elected as the acting National Chairman of the National Association of Katsina State Student. He contested as the Financial Secretary of National Association of Nigerian Students Zone A. He later founded the League for Democratic Youth, which promotes and advocates for good governance and active youth participation in governance and politics. He also founded Oil and Gas Scholars Club and Katsina Debate Club.

Because of his contribution to youth development in his state, he was nominated to represent the young people of Katsina state at the Nigerian Youth Parliament, where he was elected as the pioneer chief whip of the Parliament after contesting and winning the election of the deputy speaker of the parliament twice without having the two-thirds majority of the votes, which led to the third round election, where he lost it. However, as the chief whip of the parliament, he was able to play significant role in setting the credible foundation of the parliament under the leadership of Hon Onofiok Luke.

His outstanding service at the Nigerian Youth Parliament was appreciated by the Nigerian government and he was subsequently selected to represent the Nigerian Youth at the 2011 Commonwealth Youth Forum, which took place in Perth, Australia. This was his first official engagement with the Commonwealth and it was at this meeting that Adamu first met with Her Majesty the Queen of the United Kingdom, and afterwards, he would meet her on several other occasions. Being in Australia, he established contacts with the youth leaders across the Commonwealth, the contacts he would later use for his campaign as the Chairperson of the Commonwealth Youth Council. It was at Australia's Commonwealth Heads of Government Meeting, that the heads of government and the young people approved the establishment of the Commonwealth Youth Council, and giving way for the preparation for the first Commonwealth Youth Council's General Assembly and election, which was to hold two years after.

The election of the CYC took place in Sri Lanka during the 2013 Commonwealth Heads of Government Meeting, where Adamu emerged as the winner with a landslide defeating other youth contestants from Europe and Africa, as the position was zoned to Europe and Africa, and it is going to be rotated across other continents. Being in this position, Adamu had opportunities of participating in many global youth events and travelling across the world.

He was later appointed into many leadership positions, which include but not limited to the followings: International expert at United Nation's Global Forum on Youth Policies; Member, Policy Strategy Group, United Nations' World We Want; Member, International Panel of Judges for Youth Citizen Entrepreneurship Competition; Observer member, International Youth Task force for 2014 World Conference on Youth; Member, Advisory group panel on 50th Anniversary of the Commonwealth Secretariat. He was also the Nigerian youth observer at the ECOWAS parliament, and the founder and pioneer president of the League for Democratic Youth. Adamu was a member of the Katsina state executive council committee on youth development, he also served as the secretary of the Nigerian constitutional review consultation committee, and was the founder and president of Oil and Gas scholars club. He is the founder and president of Katsina Debate Club, publicity secretary of Civil Liberties organization, Katsina branch, Secretary of Integrity club, among so many other past leadership responsibilities and experiences.

Meeting with global leaders 
Ahmed Adamu met with many global and national leaders as well as prominent individuals across the world, among which include, Her Majesty Queen Elizabeth II of the United Kingdom; Prince Charles, the Prince of Wales; United Nations Secretary General Ban Ki-moon; many Prime Ministers and Presidents of different countries; as well as other high level government officials of different nations.

Some of the Prime Ministers and Presidents include those from Nigeria, Malta, Sri Lanka, Samoa, Grenada, Saint Lucia, Cameroon, Canada, UK, Australia, Kenya, Lesotho, Malawi, Guyana, Malaysia, and many more.

References 

1985 births
Living people
Alumni of Newcastle University
Nigerian activists